is a 1960 Japanese samurai film directed by Kenji Misumi, written by Teinosuke Kinugasa, and produced by Masaichi Nagata. The film stars Raizō Ichikawa as samurai Ryunosuke Tsukue, alongside Kojiro Hongo, Tamao Nakamura, Fujiko Yamamoto, Kenji Sugawara, and Jun Negami, and was followed by two sequels.

Cast
 Raizō Ichikawa as Ryunosuke Tsukue
 Kojiro Hongo as Hyoma Utsugi
 Tamao Nakamura as Ohama / Otoyo
 Fujiko Yamamoto as Omatsu
 Kenji Sugawara as Isami Kondō
 Jun Negami as Kamo Serizawa
 Toshiro Chiba as Toshizō Hijikata
 Saburo Niwamata as Bunnojo Utsugi
 Shōgo Shimada as Toranosuke Shimada

See also
Dai-bosatsu tōge (1957), starring Chiezō Kataoka
The Sword of Doom (1966), starring Tatsuya Nakadai

References

Sources

External links 
 

1960 films
Daiei Film films
Films directed by Kenji Misumi
Films set in Japan
Films set in Bakumatsu
Jidaigeki films
Samurai films
1960s Japanese films